Angelina Airport  is an agricultural airport  northwest of Cotuí, at the small town of El Pescozón in the Sánchez Ramírez Province of the Dominican Republic.

See also 

Transport in Dominican Republic
List of airports in Dominican Republic

References

External links 
OpenStreetMap - Angelina Airport
SkyVector - Angelina Airport
 

Airports in the Dominican Republic
Cotuí
Buildings and structures in Sánchez Ramírez Province